Sahibzada Muhammad Usman Abbasi is a Pakistani politician who is a former Deputy Speaker of the Provincial Assembly of the Punjab and member of the royal family of Bahawalpur State.

References

Living people
Pakistan People's Party MPAs (Punjab)
Bahawalpur royal family
Deputy Speakers of the Provincial Assembly of the Punjab
1954 births